Dharmadāsa can refer to:
 Dharmadāsa, author of the Sanskrit Vidagdhamukhamaṇḍana
 I. M. Dharmadasa, physicist
 Dharmadasa Walpola (1927–1983), Sri Lankan musician
 Dharmadasa Wanniarachchi (d. 2007), Sri Lankan politician
 Dharmadasa Banda (1938–2010), Sri Lankan politician

Sinhalese surnames
Sinhalese masculine given names